KPWA (93.5 FM) is an American radio station broadcasting a Christian radio format. Licensed to Bismarck, Arkansas, United States, the station is currently owned by Houston Christian Broadcasters.

History
On December 7, 2016, Central Arkansas Radio Group, LLC acquired KYRC from Noalmark Broadcasting Corporation.

On February 24, 2017, KYRC changed their format from mainstream rock to a simulcast of Christian radio-formatted KHCB-FM 105.7 Houston, Texas, as a result of a sale from Central Arkansas Radio Group, LLC to Houston Christian Broadcasters. On March 7, 2017, KYRC changed their call letters to KPWA.

Previous logo

References

External links

Hot Spring County, Arkansas
Radio stations established in 2009
2009 establishments in Arkansas
PWA